Pag may refer to:

Places
 Pag, Croatia
Pag (island), an island in the Adriatic Sea, part of Croatia
Pag (town), the largest town on the island of Pag
 Pag, Iran (disambiguation)

People
 Michel Pagliaro, musician nicknamed "Pag"

Other uses
 pag, the ISO 639-2 and ISO 639-3 code for the Pangasinan language
 Pag, nickname for Leoncavallo's 1892 opera Pagliacci, often performed on a double bill with Mascagni's Cavalleria rusticana known colloquially as "Cav and Pag"
 Pag cheese, a sheep milk cheese from the Croatian island Pag

See also
 PAG (disambiguation)
 Pags (disambiguation)
 Professional agrologist (P.Ag)